The Union Pacific Athletic Club in Laramie, Wyoming, was built in 1928.  Also known as Gray's Gables and as the Quadra Dangle Square Dance Clubhouse, it was built in log cabin style by Mads Justesen and Jack Haugum.  It was listed on the National Register of Historic Places in 1978.

References

External links
 Union Pacific Athletic Club (Gray's Gables) at the Wyoming State Historic Preservation Office

Buildings and structures completed in 1928
Buildings and structures in Laramie, Wyoming
Clubhouses on the National Register of Historic Places in Wyoming
Men's club buildings
National Register of Historic Places in Albany County, Wyoming